François Poilly, or François de Poilly, (1623 –1693) was a French engraver.

Biography
He was born in Abbeville, the son of a goldsmith who gave him his first drawing lessons. He was apprenticed to the Parisian engraver Pierre Daret. Poilly then travelled to Rome where he stayed for seven years with the engraver Cornelis Bloemaert, where he acquired mastership of the art. He died in Paris.

Works
Poilly's is noted for approximately 400 engravings. He is known for mainly religious subjects after Raphael, Guido Reni, Annibale Carracci, Pierre Mignard, Charles Le Brun, Nicolas Poussin, Sébastien Bourdon, and Eustache Lesueur.

He made the engraved illustrations of the ceremonial clothes of the orders mentioned in "Maximilien Bullot & Pierre Hélyot's Histoire des ordres ...", Ed. Nicolas Gosselin, Paris, 1719 (Google Books). See François de Poilly – History of Orders in  Wikimedia commons

Legacy
His apprentice Jean-Louis Roullet has left of him a remarkable portrait, about which Pierre-Jean Mariette wrote:

François' younger brother, Nicolas de Poilly (1626–1698), was an engraver too, as well as the latter's two sons, Jean-Baptiste de Poilly (1669–1728) and Nicolas de Poilly (1675–1723).

See also 

 Pierre Daret
 Cornelis Bloemaert
 Boucher-de-Perthes Museum in Abbeville

References

17th-century French engravers
People from Abbeville
1623 births
1693 deaths